The Master is an American action-adventure television series which aired on NBC, from January to August 1984. Created by Michael Sloan, the series focuses on the adventures of John Peter McAllister (Lee Van Cleef), an aging ninja master, and his young pupil, Max Keller (Timothy Van Patten). Most episodes focus on the mismatched pair driving around in a custom van, helping people in need along the way, similar to the contemporary NBC television series, The A-Team. The Master lasted 13 episodes before it was canceled.

Premise
The Master follows the character of John Peter McAllister, an American veteran who stayed in Japan following World War II and became a ninja master. At the beginning of the series, McAllister, now an old man, leaves Japan for the United States in search of a daughter he did not know he had. This flight from his ninja life is seen as dishonorable by his fellow ninjas, including his former student, Okasa (Sho Kosugi), who attempts to assassinate him. Escaping with a minor wound, McAllister finds himself in the small town of Ellerston, where he believes his daughter resides. Along the way, he meets a drifter named Max Keller, who aids the ninja master in a bar fight, but is subsequently thrown through a window, a recurring event for the hot-headed Keller. Max desires to learn to fight like a ninja, but McAllister is reluctant to train him, feeling him to be too emotional. When Max gets involved in a dispute between Mr. Christensen (Clu Gulager), a ruthless developer, and the Trumbulls (Claude Akins, Demi Moore), a father and daughter who run an airport targeted by Christensen, McAllister decides to train him to survive.

The pair go on to have many adventures traveling the country in search of McAllister's daughter, although the show was cancelled before she is ever found. Keller and McAllister often get sidetracked by oppressed people, and invariably McAllister uses his ninja skills to help save the day, hopefully teaching Max at the same time.

The character of Teri McAllister triggers John Peter McAllister's return to America by writing a letter to him. She is constantly on the move, and has been spotted in New Orleans (about six months to a year before she contacted her father; she was already using his surname at the time) Ellerston, Atlanta, and New York - working briefly but very successfully as a fashion model in the last city. She is secretive about her personal information, never giving out an address or a phone number. In her modelling career, she rebuffed the villainous fashion designer and jewel thief Simon Garrett when he tried to romance her, and was on friendly terms with Gina, an FBI agent posing as an executive at the modelling agency. After Teri moved on, Gina impersonated her in order to trap Garrett, becoming entangled with Max and the Master in the process. Teri does not appear to have been aware of Gina's profession, and Gina's impersonation is aimed at people who don't know Teri well, so her behavior in the role should not be taken as necessarily typical of the other woman's. Teri herself is only seen in photographs: she appears as a strikingly attractive woman, somewhere in her mid or early twenties (despite dialogue in "Fat Tuesday" indicating her to be 28 or 29), with dark blue eyes and heavy black hair. She is the result of a two-month affair between McAllister and a woman called Laura Kennedy, at the end of the Korean War. McAllister asks Gina with sincere curiosity about Teri's mother, in a way that suggests he still has some interest in the mother of his daughter (even though "nobody could live with Laura Kennedy" for long) and believes her to be alive. In addition to her brief modelling career, she was also a pilot of racing planes for a time (circa her visit to New Orleans). Most information about her comes from "Fat Tuesday" and "The Good, the Bad, and the Priceless", both stories about women who know her vaguely and use her name to trap a villain.

A recurring enemy is Okasa, the rogue pupil of McAllister, who continually tracks his old master down and tries to kill him. In the first episode, the two duel and McAllister wins. However, the old master refuses to kill his opponent, preferring to renounce his ninja ways, allowing Okasa to make further attempts in future episodes.

Opening credits
"John Peter McAllister, the only Occidental American to achieve the martial arts discipline of a ninja. Once part of a secret sect he wanted to leave, but was marked for death by his fellow ninjas. He's searching for a daughter he didn't know he had; pursued by Okasa, once the Master's student, now sworn to kill him. That Master found a new student. That's me, Max Keller. But we knew Okasa would be behind us, in the shadows, ready to strike again."

Cast and characters
Lee Van Cleef as John Peter McAllister aka "The Master": A World War II and Korean War veteran who stayed in Japan and became the first Occidental ninja. Trained Okasa in the ninja arts before he returned to America and taking on Max Keller as his student. A self-described "cantankerous old man who's lived alone a lot of years", he is a stern but fair teacher, and a skilled fighter, though his age is catching up with him. Often grumpy and sarcastic towards other men, both friend and foe, but somewhat more mellow around Max, and politely flirtatious or self-consciously "charming" towards women. Several pieces of his colorful history appear throughout the series: he flew P-40s during WWII ("Hostages", "Juggernaut"), visited New York in 1938 ("The Good, the Bad and the Priceless"), and attended a sort of conference of secret assassin organizations in the Far East in 1972, where he gave a martial arts demonstration ("The Good, the Bad and the Priceless"). He met Brian Elkwood in Washington DC in 1948, and the two men were subsequently imprisoned together in North Korea, but escaped by using a motorcycle ("Kunoichi"). He has apparently visited Hawaii about twenty years ago: a friend who lives there has a daughter Max's age, whom McAllister remembers seeing when she was a baby ("Java Tiger"). He denies having filmed Westerns in Almería, Spain with (fictional) actor Saul Robbins c. 1969 ("Rogues"), but his reactions to Robbins's claim to remember him seem to suggest otherwise-he was perhaps on some kind of secret mission for which the film(s) made a good cover. He "always wanted to be a cowboy" ("High Rollers"), but makes not wanting to dress up as one an excuse to turn down an ad exec who wants McAllister to shill for him ("The Good, the Bad and the Priceless"). There are several recurring trains of thought that show up in his conversation, e.g. Eastern mysticism, but the closest thing he has to a catchphrase is probably "no kidding", said in an exasperated tone to people's more obvious statements.
Timothy Van Patten as Max Keller: A drifter who spends most of his time driving around in his custom van and taking odd jobs wherever he can find them. He has a pet hamster (or possibly a gerbil) named Henry who lives in a dash-mounted, wheel-shaped cage. There are several indications that he has some money to fall back on: his van's customizations (hamster cage, souped-up engine, semi-bullet-proofing), the fact that he keeps an expensive-looking dirt bike ("State of the Union") and can afford to rent an ultralight plane ("Hostages"). He often gets thrown out of bar windows. He has a bit of a temper, but is learning to keep that in check due to McAllister's training. Max never passes up a chance to get friendly with a pretty woman of his own age. Max is initially estranged from his father-a lawyer who sank into alcoholism ("Failure to Communicate") after Max's mother and older brother died in a plane crash ("High Rollers") -but the two reconcile late in the series. Max's mother wanted him to be an accountant. Max went to the high school prom with a girlfriend who wanted to be a dancer on Broadway but ended up working in Vegas and having a child by someone else ("Hostages", "High Rollers"). At aforementioned prom, he shared a dance with the class nerd, who he meets again in the course of the series and become involved with ("Rogues"). He grew up on the East Side of New York ("The Good, the Bad and the Priceless"), though his father lives in California ("Failure to Communicate").
Sho Kosugi as Okasa: A deadly ninja warrior once trained by McAllister. He has sworn to kill his former master due to his abandonment of the ninja code. Has engaged McAllister on several occasions with different levels of success. He is also a master of disguise. By the finale, he has himself trained at least one "Occidental" as a ninja. In his last duel with McAllister, he believes he is winning, and even manages to break the Master's ninja-to, but loses when McAllister turns his overconfidence against him. He sometimes takes espionage-related "jobs" while pursuing his former master, but is more often working at cross-purposes to the villain of the episode.
Kosugi also served as Van Cleef's fight double, as well as the series' fight choreographer, ninja technical advisor and stunt coordinator.

Episodes

Cancellation
The Master did not attract a large enough audience to remain on the air and was cancelled after 13 episodes.

Ninjutsu mythology

The Master is an exemplar of the ninja of popular mythology, rather than a realistic portrayal of contemporary or historical ninjutsu, but the series also has some surprising nods towards the actual practices of ninjutsu. For instance, most of the series (save for the first two episodes) have the heroes using shurikens for a variety of nonlethal tasks-throwing them to disarm an enemy, or using them as hand-held knives to cut through window latches-rather than the more stereotypical and lethal uses of popular mythology. There is also some emphasis on the spiritual or character-building aspects of "ninjitsu", as the series calls it, using the older romanization.

The first few episodes hint at a complicated and intrigue-filled ninja mythos, but this was largely dropped as the series progressed, perhaps out of fear that giving McAllister a constant stream of Asian ninja adversaries (as opposed to just Okasa, whose business with the Master is personal) would be seen as racist.

The series makes reference to the ninja as a "sect" with different "Houses", apparently corresponding to dojos. The only two Houses represented in the series use a butterfly and a snake as their respective emblems. The former animal symbolizes the human soul in authentic Japanese tradition, the latter has no consistent significance. "Master", the title McAllister has, seems to mark him out as a high-level teacher and the head of a House, as does the silver medallion he wears. One succeeds to the headship of a House, by killing the current Master and taking his medallion (this is Okasa's objective throughout the series), but there are presumably less violent methods of succession as well. McAllister's tendency to end duels prematurely by feigning injury or luring adversaries to charge through windows or into dangerous electrical equipment always takes his duelling partners by surprise, implying that his methods are not entirely "honorable" by their standards.

Ninjitsu is represented as having had a dark and violent history, which it had turned away from during the time McAllister was involved. It is implied that the ninja are reverting to this darker and older tradition as of the series' time frame, and this may have been a factor in McAllister's departure from the "sect". Lika, a character from "Out of Time Step" is the only "Snake" ninja encountered, and he preaches a kind of anarcho-nihilism that uses this fictional ninja history as a justification for committing crimes.

All the other ninja seen in the series are trained by McAllister or his pupils, and so belong in a sense to his House, which uses the butterfly emblem. The symbolism of this House's emblem (see above) and McAllister's heavy emphasis on the ki (or chi) and the process of character-building seem to indicate that this House specializes in Seishin teki kyoko, the ninja discipline of spiritual refinement.

Ratings

Home media
During the mid 1980s, the show was re-edited into a series of 90-minute movies, each containing two episodes. These were released on VHS under a number of different titles:

The first two episodes ("Max" and "Out Of Time Step") were also released on VHS by Platinum Disc Corporation with the original series title in 1999. These same two episodes also appeared in the Martial Arts DVD 50-movie pack produced by Mill Creek Entertainment in 2006.

The entire, unedited series was released on DVD and Blu-ray by Kino Lorber under license from CBS Home Entertainment on February 20, 2018.

Legacy

Mystery Science Theater 3000
The series was featured on Mystery Science Theater 3000, a sketch comedy television series about a man and two robots subject to watch cheesy B movies as part of a mad scientist's experiment. The show featured the first two volumes of the re-edited Master Ninja tapes on episodes 322 (originally aired January 11, 1992) and 324 (originally aired January 25, 1992). Notable jokes include jabs at Van Cleef's obvious stunt double and Van Patten's muffled speech pattern. Both episodes were released on Mystery Science Theater 3000, Volume XX on March 8, 2011.

The third volume was intended for episode 624,  but, for unspecified reasons, was replaced by Samson vs. the Vampire Women.

This Movie Sucks!
The pilot episode was featured on the similarly oriented show This Movie Sucks! which is hosted by Ed the Sock, Liana K and Ron Sparks. Shown as part of the season two opener and shown as a double feature alongside Jesse James Meets Frankenstein's Daughter, the showing was notable for Sparks' "Roninja" gag, which quickly became a favorite among fans.

References in other media
 There is a link to The Master in the game Ninja Master by Firebird, for the ZX Spectrum and likely other systems as well.  The Ninja Master theme is exactly the same as that of The Master.

References

External links
 
 
 

1984 American television series debuts
1984 American television series endings
1980s American drama television series
American action adventure television series
English-language television shows
Martial arts television series
NBC original programming
Ninja fiction
Japan in non-Japanese culture